Haunted USA was an American paranormal television series that premiered on October 8, 2017 in the United States on the Travel Channel. The 4-part special series featured allegedly haunted cities or towns in America and their "darker side". Each episode focused on visitors claiming to encounter restless spirits, fearsome entities, and vengeful ghosts in allegedly haunted locations. Interviews with paranormal investigators, supernatural shop owners and ghost hunting tourists were featured.

Episodes

References

External links

Travel Channel original programming
Paranormal reality television series
2017 American television series debuts